Ignacio Sanz Paz (born 30 November 1955) is a retired Spanish judoka. He competed in the 1980 and 1984 Summer Olympics and placed fifth in 1980.

References

1955 births
Living people
Olympic judoka of Spain
Judoka at the 1980 Summer Olympics
Judoka at the 1984 Summer Olympics
Spanish male judoka
20th-century Spanish people